This is an overview of the progression of the Olympic track cycling record of the women's 500 m team sprint as recognised by the Union Cycliste Internationale (UCI).

The women's 500 m team sprint was introduced at the 2012 Summer Olympics.

Progression
♦ denotes a performance that is also a current world record.  Statistics are correct as of the end of the 2020 Summer Olympics.

During the Qualification session there were several teams who rode a new best time and so had temporary the Olympic Record. They are not listed as Olympic Record holders because they did not win the qualification session. These countries who had temporary the Olympic record are:
 Heat 1: : Daniela Larreal, Mariaesthela Vilera in a time of 34.320
 Heat 2: : Lyubov Shulika, Olena Tsyos in a time of 33.708
 Heat 3: : Yvonne Hijgenaar, Willy Kanis in a time of 33.253
 Heat 4: : Victoria Pendleton, Jessica Varnish in a time of 32.526

References

Track cycling Olympic record progressions
Women's team sprint